Zou Jiayi (born June 1963) is a Chinese politician, a current vice minister of the Ministry of Finance of the People's Republic of China. Zou is a director of China Investment Corporation.

Early life
Zou was born in June 1963 in Wuxi, Jiangsu province. She joined the Chinese Communist Party in 1984. She attended the University of International Relations in Beijing as an undergraduate. She holds a master's degree from the Institute of World Economy & Politics of the Chinese Academy of Social Sciences.

Career
Zou began working for the Ministry of Finance in 1988. From 1994 to 1996, Zou worked as a deputy chief of the department of the Ministry of Finance responsible for World Bank-related affairs, and from 1996 to 1998, as an advisor to China's World Bank Executive Board Office.

In 1999, pointing to the 1997 Asian financial crisis and Kosovo War, Zou was one of a number of Chinese analysts who expressed skepticism about American financial hegemony and cautioned China to make sure it protected its best interests and did not sacrifice too much in attempts to join the World Trade Organization.

From 1998 to 2015, Zou continued to work for the Ministry of Finance, eventually becoming director of its International Economic Relations Department in 2014. In 2015, she briefly served as  a member of the Ministry's internal Communist Party committee and assistant minister of finance before transferring to a post in the Central Commission for Discipline Inspection, serving until 2017, when she was again promoted to Vice Minister of the Ministry of Supervision. In March 2018 she became a member of the leadership committee of the newly formed National Supervisory Commission, but was then brought back to the Ministry of Finance in June as one of its Vice Ministers and a Party committee member.

She was China's representative to 15th anniversary commemoration of the United Nations Convention against Corruption in 2018.

In June 2019, Zou was named to the 14-member monetary policy advisory committee of the People's Bank of China.

References

People's Republic of China politicians from Jiangsu
Chinese Communist Party politicians from Jiangsu
Politicians from Wuxi
Chinese women economists
1963 births
20th-century Chinese economists
21st-century Chinese economists
21st-century Chinese politicians
21st-century Chinese women politicians
University of International Relations alumni
Living people